9-Methylene-fluorene or dibenzofulvene (DBF) is a polycyclic aromatic hydrocarbon with chemical formula C14H10.

Properties
9-Methylene-fluorene is an intermediate of Fmoc cleavage reaction. It is an analog of a 1,1-diphenylethylene. Polymerization of 9-methylene-fluorene produces a π-stacked polymer.

See also 
 Fluorene
 Fluorenylmethyloxycarbonyl chloride
 Fluorenylidene

References

Fluorenes
Polycyclic aromatic hydrocarbons
Vinylidene compounds